In 2003, there were 28 This American Life episodes.

Act 1: Polly Wants More Than a Cracker – Veronica Chater
Act 2: On the Border Between Good and Bad – Russell Banks

Act 1: Until the End of the War – Jack Hitt
Act 2: Secret Trials and Secret Deportations – David Kestenbaum
Act 3: Secret Wiretaps from a Secret Court – Blue Chevigny

Susan Burton and Hyder Akbar won the Third Coast Festival Silver Award for Best Documentary for this episode
Act 1: Teenage Embed – Hyder Akbar and Susan Burton

Act 1: The Rundown – Starlee Kine
Act 2: Heather Help Me – Jessica Riddle
Act 3: Fools Rush In, Where Mommies Fear to Tread
Act 4: The Science of Good and Evil – Susan Drury

Act 1: Jarhead – Anthony Swofford
Act 2: What's the Truth Good For, Anyway? – Ira Glass
Act 3: Jar Jar Head – John Hodgman

Act 1: Puppy Love – Molly FitzSimons
Act 2: Making Money the Old Fashioned Way – Mary Beth Kirshner
Act 3: The First Starting from Scratch – Jonathan Goldstein

Act 1: How to Write a Note – Jake Warga
Act 2: The Battle of Words vs Fear – Michael Bernard Loggins
Act 3: When a City Opens its Big Mouth
Act 4: Wedding Bells and Door Bells – Elizabeth Gilbert and Jonathan Goldstein

Act 1: Bombs over Baghdad – Ira Glass
Act 2: Tice Ridley is a first Lieutenant in the Army
Act 3: What's French for French Fries? – David Sedaris
Act 4: Fighting the Previous War – Sarah Vowell
Act 5: What Peacetime Forgets about Wartime – Lee Sandlin
Act 6: Lessons from Ancient Wars – Mary Zimmerman and Ira Glass

Act 1: Dave Knows – Susan Drury
Act 2: Stock Making Sense – Alex Blumberg
Act 3: A View from the Mop – Greg Tate

Act 1: Unconquerable – Katie Davis
Act 2: Or Give Me Death – Sarah Koenig
Act 3: The Heart is a Lonely Junta – Ira Glass and Jeffrey Brown

Act 1: The Chasm Between Comedy and Music – Jonathan Goldstein and Starlee Kine
Act 2: Star of Bethlehem – Nancy Updike
Act 3: Translating for the Very, Very, Very, Very Tall – Jesse Hardman

Act 1: Losing It – Jonathan Goldstein
Act 2: Teacher Hit Me With a Ruler – Sarah Vowell
Act 3: I Found Your Letter – Davy Rothbart

Act 1: It's Not Just the Aces That Are Wild – David Sedaris
Act 2: Playing Clinton in the Bush Leagues – Katy Vine
Act 3: You Talkin' to Me? – Adam Davidson

Act 1: Don't I Know You? – Tate Donovan and Starlee Kine
Act 2: No of Course I Know You – Scott Carrier
Act 3: It's Commerce that Brings Us Together – Susan Drury
Act 4: The Sound of One Hand Waving – Patty Martin
Act 5: The Sound of No Hands Clapping – Viki Merrick, Eric Kipp, and Jay Allison
Act 6: Reaching Out with Radio – "Joey" and "Jake" with Blunt Youth Radio Project
Act 7: Up Where the Air is Clear – Jonathan Goldstein
Act 8: The Greatest Dog Name in the World – Valion Loetz, Paris Loetz and Katie Adone
Act 9: Of Dogs and Men – Elaine Boehm and Jim Sultzer
Act 10: Untitled – Neo-Futurists
Act 11: Etiquette Lesson – David Sedaris
Act 12: To Tell the Truth – Brent Runyon
Act 13: More Lies – Catharyn and Ira Glass
Act 14: Call in Colonel Mustard or That's What Happens when you Don't Use a Condoment Kids – Ira Glass
Act 15: Mr. Prediction – David Rakoff
Act 16: That One Guy at the Office – ?Drewdanna Gustafson?
Act 17: You Can't Choose Your Gift – ?Richard Carry? and Jim Sultzer
Act 18: Party Talk – Chuck Klosterman
Act 19: The Hard Life at the Top – David Lipsky
Act 20: The Greatest Moment I Saw On Stage – Ira Glass

Act 1: Confession – Carl Marziali
Act 2: Blood Agent – Ira Glass
Act 3: And I Love Her – Etgar Keret
Act 4: Yet another ineffective road map for world leadership – Blue Chevigny

Act 1: The Hiker and the Cowman Should be Friends – Scott Carrier
Act 2: Scrapbook, the Verb
Act 3: Slingshot – John Hodgman

Act 1: Bolt of Lightning, Pro and Con – Ira Glass
Act 2: Files in Cakes, Ha! – Angelo
Act 3: So Crazy It Just Might Work – Elizabeth Gilbert
Act 4: A Girl's Guide to Mending the Unmendable – Susan Burton

Act 1: Return to the Scene of the Crime – Jonathan Goldstein
Act 2: Does Niceness Pay? – Ira Glass
Act 3: And What's Going on With You? – Mike Albo and Virginia Heffernan
Act 4: Keeping It in the Family – Bernard Cooper

Act 1: Who Put the "Pistol" in "Epistolary"? – Ira Glass
Act 2: Pen Pal Husband – Janice Powell

Act 1: Inside the Romance Industry – Robin Epstein
Act 2: View from the Other Half – Griffin Hansbury
Act 3: A Love Story – Sarah Vowell

Prologue – David Rakoff
Act 1: If It Drives, Go Live – Starlee Kine follows up on a 2001 low speed car chase in Los Angeles
Act 2: Don't Just Stand There – Sheila Peabody
Act 3: Hello, Baby – David Rakoff
Act 4: On the Eighth Day, God Created Tartar Sauce – Curtis Sittenfeld on a Mobile Bay jubilee

Act 1: Oh, Mr. San Man – Ira Glass
Act 2: Except for the Smell, I Think I Have a Crush on You – Luis Urrea
Act 3: "I'm a Legitimate Businessman ... Waste Management."'

Act 1: Rock, Paper, Computer – Jack Hitt
Act 2: Detroit Is In the House – Alex Blumberg
Act 3: Zero Divided By Zero Is Still Zero – Adrian Nicole LeBlanc

Act 1: Whatever Happened to Baby Cain? – Jonathan Goldstein
Act 2: This Land is Your Land, This Land Is My Land – Nancy Updike
Act 3: Neighbor's Keeper – Robert Kurson

Act 1: DukiAct 2: Winged WarriorAct 3: Chicken Diva – Jack Hitt
Act 4: Trying to Respect the Chicken – Ira Glass

Act 1: No Island Is An Island – Jack Hitt
Act 2: On Hold, No One Can Hear You Scream – Julie Snyder

Act 1: Part One – Hyder Akbar
Act 2: Part Two – Hyder Akbar

Act 1: Make a Joyous Noise Unto Your Mom – Ian Brown
Act 2: A Christmas MemoryAct 3: Secret Santa'' – Caitlin Shetterly

External links
This American Lifes radio archive for 2003

2003
This American Life
This American Life